The Chinese noctule (Nyctalus plancyi) is a common and widespread species of bat belonging to the family Vespertilionidae.

Distribution and habitat
The Chinese noctule is endemic to China and occurs in most of its provinces, plus Hong Kong and Taiwan. They typically inhabit forests, but also commonly appear within rural communities. The bats are often found roosting under buildings, hollow trees, ruins, caves, and rock crevices.

Description
The Chinese noctule are distinguished by their golden brown fur.

References

Mammals described in 1880
Nyctalus
Bats of Asia
Taxa named by Zéphirin Gerbe